Burra (short for Kookaburra) is an Australian steam locomotive. It was ordered by Corrimal Colliery, to work at the colliery, on 1 May 1923 and delivered on 26 November 1923. In 1946 an overhaul with a new boiler was carried out by Clyde Engineering.

Following the purchase of Corrimal Colliery by Australian Iron & Steel Burra was restored and placed on static display at the steelworks in 1968. In 1978 it was donated to the Illawarra Light Railway Museum. The locomotive was restored to service in 1995 and remains operational.

References

Further reading

0-4-0 locomotives
Burra
2 ft gauge locomotives